Plinia complanata, is a species of plant in the family Myrtaceae. It was discovered in the coastal forests of São Paulo (state), Brazil and first described in 2002.

References

complanata
Crops originating from the Americas
Crops originating from Brazil
Tropical fruit
Endemic flora of Brazil
Fruits originating in South America
Cauliflory
Fruit trees
Berries
Plants described in 2002